Andrzej Kozik (born 20 December 1953) is a Polish luger. He competed in the men's doubles event at the 1976 Winter Olympics.

References

1953 births
Living people
Polish male lugers
Olympic lugers of Poland
Lugers at the 1976 Winter Olympics
People from Lubań County